Livien Ven (16 February 1934 – 20 May 2015) was a Belgian rower. He competed in the men's coxed pair event at the 1956 Summer Olympics.

References

1934 births
2015 deaths
Belgian male rowers
Olympic rowers of Belgium
Rowers at the 1956 Summer Olympics
Sportspeople from Antwerp